Stade Municipal is a multi-use stadium in Bouna, Côte d'Ivoire. It is currently used mostly for football matches. It serves as a home ground of Sabé Sports de Bouna. The stadium holds 1,200 people.

Football venues in Ivory Coast
Buildings and structures in Zanzan District
Sport in Zanzan District
Bounkani